Kulbakul, also known as Kulbakun, may refer to:
 Kulbakul-e Bozorg
 Kulbakul-e Kuchak